HSI an initialism for Hudson Smith International, is an elite track and field training group and team centered on former UCLA coach John Walton Smith and sports agent/attorney Emanuel Hudson.  The group was formed in 1996 after the former 1972 Olympian had led Quincy Watts and Kevin Young to 1992 Olympic gold medals.

Among the members of the group are Olympic medalists Maurice Greene, Ato Boldon, Allen Johnson, Tasha Danvers, Inger Miller, Jon Drummond and Dawn Harper.  From its inception, the team dominated global sprinting events for a decade.  Members of the team have combined to run world class relay marks under the HSI banner.  Team members were known for their braggadocio or trash talking, but their accomplishments backed up their words.

As world record holder in the prestigious 100 metres, Greene was the most publicized of the athletes. Greene virtually ran the table of World Athletics Championships and Olympics in that event from 1997 to 2001, his closest competitor at that level frequently being Boldon.  Johnson had a similar winning streak in the 110 metres hurdles between 1995 and 2003.  The two combined for what might have been the greatest post race celebration stunt in 2004 at the Adidas Track Classic when Greene, coming back from injuries won his 100 metres race then took off his shoes as if they were on fire. With a national TV audience watching, Larry Wade then ran onto the track and put them out with a real fire extinguisher.

American members
Christian Coleman 2 World Championship Silver Medals, World Indoor Championship Gold Medal, World Indoor Record Holder for the 60 meter dash
Dalilah Muhammad Olympic Gold Medal, 2 World Championship Silver Medals
English Gardner 1 Olympic Gold Medal, 2 World Championship Silver Medals
Dawn Harper 2 Olympic medals, 1 gold, 2 World Championship Medals
Kristi Castlin 1 Olympic Bronze Medal
Michael Norman 2 World Junior Championship Gold Medals, World Indoor 400m Record Holder 
Dezerea Bryant 1 World Championship Silver Medal
Jon Drummond  2 Olympic medals, 1 gold, 2 World Championship gold medals
Torri Edwards 1 Olympic medal disqualified due to Marion Jones, 4 World Championship medals, 2 gold
Kenneth Ferguson
Maurice Greene  4 Olympic medals, 2 gold, 5 World Championship gold medals, World record 100 metres
Regina Jacobs 2 World Championship silver medals
Allen Johnson  Olympic gold medal, 5 World Championship medals, 4 gold
Lawrence Johnson  Olympic silver medal
Inger Miller 1 Olympic gold medal, 5 World Championship medals, 3 gold but 1 disqualified due to Marion Jones
David Neville 2 Olympic medals, 1 gold
Jason Pyrah
Jason Richardson  Olympic silver medal, World Championship gold medal
Quincy Watts  2 Olympic gold medals, 2 World Championship medals, 1 gold
Kevin Young Olympic gold medal while setting current World Record 400 metres hurdles, 1 World Championship gold medal
Leonard Scott World Indoor Championship Gold Medal

International members
The members of the training group were not limited to American athletes.  Athletes from several countries trained together in Los Angeles.

Hussein Taher Al-Sabee 
Hadi Soua'an Al-Somaily  Olympic silver medal
Ato Boldon  4 Olympic medals, 4 World Championship medals, 1 gold
Emmanuel Callender  2 Olympic medals, 1 World Championship medal
Tasha Danvers  1 Olympic medal
Cathy Freeman  trained with the group for a short period of time.  2 Olympic medals, 1 gold,  2 World Championship gold medals
Anju Bobby George  first World Championship medal for India
Jehue Gordon  1 World Championship Gold Medal
Khalifa St. Fort   1 World Championship Bronze Medal
Martial Mbandjock 
Pilar McShine 
Jaysuma Saidy Ndure 
Marie-José Pérec  3 Olympic gold medals, 2 World Championship gold medals
Mohammed Shaween 
Richard Thompson  3 Olympic medals, 1 World Championship medal
Teddy Venel 
Rhonda Watkins

External links
 HSI promo video
 French video report
 Training demonstration

References

Running clubs in the United States
Track and field clubs in the United States
Sports teams in Los Angeles
Clubs and societies in the United States
Athletics clubs in the United States
Track and field in California
1996 establishments in the United States